Monticola is a historic plantation home and farm located along the James River near Howardsville, Albemarle County, Virginia. The house was built in 1853 for planter, merchant and banker Daniel James Hartsook, and is a three-story, three-bay, brick Greek Revival style dwelling.  The front facade features a central, two-story, pedimented portico.  The rear facade has a semi-circular, two-level, porch with Colonial Revival details.  It was added about 1890 by Prussian born Richmond tobacco exporter, Emil Otto Nolting, who had purchased the estate three years earlier in 1887.

The four corners of the house are adorned by giant stuccoed pilasters.  The original two-story, brick kitchen building is attached to the house by an enclosed breezeway. Also on the property are a smokehouse, storage shed, corn crib, and the foundation of a late-19th century spring house.

During the Civil War Monticola was commandeered by Union Army General Phillip Sheridan who briefly used it as his headquarters while his forces raided Howardsville and the surrounding area.

It was added to the National Register of Historic Places in 1990.

References

External links
Photographs of Monticola in the Library of Congress, Carnegie Survey of the Architecture of the South, 1935

Houses on the National Register of Historic Places in Virginia
Colonial Revival architecture in Virginia
Greek Revival houses in Virginia
Houses completed in 1853
Houses in Albemarle County, Virginia
National Register of Historic Places in Albemarle County, Virginia